Chinese musical instruments are traditionally grouped into eight categories known as . The eight categories are silk, bamboo, wood, stone, metal, clay, gourd and skin; other instruments considered traditional exist that may not fit these groups. The grouping of instruments in material categories in China is one of the first musical groupings ever devised.

Silk (絲)
Silk instruments are mostly stringed instruments (including those that are plucked, bowed, and struck). Since ancient times, the Chinese have used twisted silk for strings, though today metal or nylon are more frequently used. Instruments in the silk category include:

Plucked

Bowed

Struck

Combined
 - strucked and bowed zither from Shandong, China.

Bamboo (竹)

Bamboo mainly refers to woodwind instruments, which includes;

Flutes

Free reed pipes

Single reed pipes

Double reed pipes

Wood (木)

Most wood instruments are percussion instruments of the ancient variety:

Percussion instruments

Stone

The stone category comprises various forms of stone chimes.

Metal (金)

Clay (土)

Gourd (匏)

Hide-skin (革)

Others

Ethnic instruments

Playing contexts
Chinese instruments are either played solo, collectively in large orchestras (as in the former imperial court) or in smaller ensembles (in teahouses or public gatherings). Normally, there is no conductor in traditional Chinese music, nor any use of musical scores or tablature in performance. Music was generally learned aurally and memorized by the musician(s) beforehand, then played without aid. As of the 20th century, musical scores have become more common, as has the use of conductors in larger orchestral-type ensembles.

Musical instruments in use in the 1800s
These watercolour illustrations, made in China in the 1800s, show several types of musical instruments being played:

See also
Music of China
Chinese culture
Chinese art
Chinese instrument classification
List of ensemble formations in traditional Chinese music
C-Rock

References
Notes

Sources
Lee, Yuan-Yuan and Shen, Sinyan. Chinese Musical Instruments (Chinese Music Monograph Series). 1999. Chinese Music Society of North America Press. 
Shen, Sinyan. Chinese Music in the 20th Century (Chinese Music Monograph Series). 2001. Chinese Music Society of North America Press. 
Yuan, Bingchang, and Jizeng Mao (1986). Zhongguo Shao Shu Min Zu Yue Qi Zhi. Beijing: Xin Shi Jie Chu Ban She/Xin Hua Shu Dian Beijing Fa Xing Suo Fa Xing. .

External links
Chinese musical instruments
Chinese Musical Instruments Leisure and Cultural Services Department, Hong Kong
Chime A look at ancient Chinese instruments
Chinese musical instruments (Chinese)
Chinese Instruments Website (English)
Chinese musical instruments
The Musical Instruments E-book
World of Instrumental Music
The Grand Chinese New Year Concert
Chinese Instrument
Chinese Musical Instruments (The Modern Appearance)
https://www.britannica.com/art/qin-musical-instrument

Traditional Chinese music
 
Chinese